Where current settlements are listed they are not the same as the disappeared villages. For example, Stevenage relocated to be closer to the Great North Road, abandoning the previous Stevenage.

II denotes any change in position

Reasons for desertion 

 Climatic change - several calamitous harvests from 1272 on, the end of the Medieval Warm Period followed by a persistently wetter and cooler climate from 1300, and disastrous years in 1317–19. Great variability in the weather, notably the seven-day storm of January 1362.
 Agrarian blight - land that had previously been the most fertile (especially toward the north-east of the county) had been overfarmed. The rise of grain prices following climatic change led to a preference for arable farming over stock. Stock levels also fell due to murrain. The consequent lack of manure from stock let to the land's fertility declining. See Great Famine of 1315-1317 and the List of famines.
 Black Death (1348-9)
 Migration - village relocates to be nearer major road in order to exploit passing trade, as Stevenage did in regard to the Great North Road. The new location positioned it to be an obvious choice for the core of one of the country's first new towns.
 Pasture - the switch to pasture, exemplified by the enclosures, required less manpower, leading to the decline of village life.
 Landscaping - village destroyed or relocated to create parkland for a noble's house. Pendley, destroyed soon after 1440 for Sir Robert Whittingham. Kitts End was incorporated in the Byng (Viscount Torrington) family's Wrotham Park estate in the 19th century having dwindled after the construction of a new Barnet - Ridge Hill road in 1826.
 Urban growth - the growth of Baldock, Buntingford, Royston, St Albans and others with markets or monastic premises seems to have sucked the life from several villages nearby.

References

External links 

Hertfordshire
 
Lost settlements